The following highways are numbered 403:

Canada
 Manitoba Provincial Road 403
 Newfoundland and Labrador Route 403
 Highway 403 (Ontario)

Costa Rica
 National Route 403

Croatia
 D403 road

Hungary
 Main road 403 (Hungary)

Japan
 Japan National Route 403

Thailand
 Thailand Route 403

United States
  Georgia State Route 403 (unsigned designation for Interstate 85)
  Indiana State Road 403 (former)
 New York:
  New York State Route 403
 County Route 403 (Albany County, New York)
  County Route 403 (Erie County, New York)
  North Carolina Highway 403
  Pennsylvania Route 403
  Puerto Rico Highway 403
  Rhode Island Route 403
  South Carolina Highway 403
  Virginia State Route 403
  Washington State Route 403